Thomas Owen Jacobsen (23 April 1864 – 15 June 1941) was a British businessman and Liberal politician. He was born in Richmond Terrace, Liverpool, on 23 April 1864, and was the son of a naturalised Dane. He was a master printer and the senior partner in the stationery company of Jacobsen, Welch and Company, whose paper mills were at Hyde, Cheshire.

In March 1916, Francis Neilson, MP for Hyde, resigned his seat. Jacobsen was chosen as the Liberal candidate and was endorsed by the Asquith led Coalition Government. He was elected at the ensuing by-election. He held the seat until the 1918 general election, when the constituency was abolished. In 1917, he was appointed as private secretary to Leo Chiozza Money, Parliamentary Secretary to the Ministry of Shipping.
In 1918, he contested the new seat of Stalybridge and Hyde and was defeated.

Jacobsen was a resident of Brixton in South London and, in 1919, he was elected as a member of the London County Council for Lambeth North. He was part of the Liberal-supported Progressive grouping on the council. In 1921, the MP for Southwark South East resigned and Jacobsen was chosen by the local Liberal Progressive and Radical Association to fight the by-election. He was not opposed by the Conservative Party but refused to describe himself as a Coalition Liberal, but as a "Liberal supporting the Coalition Government". The by-election took place on 14 December 1921 when Jacobsen was heavily defeated by Thomas Naylor, leader of the London Labour Party.

Jacobsen retired from the London County Council in 1922, and stood unsuccessfully for the Liberals at Lambeth Kennington at the 1923 general election. He was going to stand at the 1924 general election but withdrew. The 1929 election was his last electoral contest, when he failed to win the City of London for the Liberals.

Jacobsen retired from politics and was president of the Stationers Association of Great Britain and Ireland from 1929 to 1931. In 1935, the Jacobsen and Welch Company was sold. He died in Worthing, Sussex, in 1941, aged 77.

Electoral record

References

External links 

Liberal Party (UK) MPs for English constituencies
1864 births
1941 deaths
UK MPs 1910–1918
Members of London County Council
Progressive Party (London) politicians
English people of Danish descent
Businesspeople from Liverpool
National Liberal Party (UK, 1922) politicians